Christian Michael Parker (born July 3, 1975) is an American former baseball player. He was drafted by the Montreal Expos in the 4th round of the 1996 Major League Baseball draft. Parker has played in one Major League Baseball (MLB) game during his career, which came on April 6, 2001. He pitched three innings for the New York Yankees, and gave up seven runs in three innings, while striking out one.

Parker was the player to be named later in the trade that sent Hideki Irabu to Montreal. Following the 2002 season, he was granted free agency, and went on to sign with New York once more, although he never again appeared in a Major League game. He was granted free agency after the 2003 season, and ended up signing with Montreal again. He signed with the Colorado Rockies after the 2004 season.

On May 12, while playing for the Colorado Springs Sky Sox in the Rockies organization, Parker was suspended for violating the minor league steroid policy. He was again a free agent following the 2005 season, and has not signed with a team since.

References

External links

1975 births
Living people
American expatriate baseball players in Canada
American sportspeople in doping cases
Baseball players from Albuquerque, New Mexico
Baseball players suspended for drug offenses
Cape Fear Crocs players
Colorado Springs Sky Sox players
Columbus Clippers players
Edmonton Trappers players
Harrisburg Senators players
Major League Baseball pitchers
New York Yankees players
Norwich Navigators players
Notre Dame Fighting Irish baseball players
Ottawa Lynx players
Tampa Yankees players
Trenton Thunder players
Tulsa Drillers players
Vermont Expos players
West Palm Beach Expos players
Alaska Goldpanners of Fairbanks players